The Museum of Post and Telecommunications is a museum in Polhov Gradec (central Slovenia) presenting the history of mail and telecommunications. It was established in 1985 and is the oldest communications institution in the country. It stems from the tradition of the Museum of the Hungarian Crown Post Office, established in Budapest in 1887. The museum, which from 1985 until 2008 operated at Loka Castle in Škofja Loka, now resides at Polhov Gradec Manor. It is a branch of the Technical Museum of Slovenia. It has several sections, including a section on the role of women as switchboard operators and telegraphists. It also keeps a collection of stamps.

References

External links
 Official page

Museums in Slovenia
Postal history of Slovenia
Telecommunications in Slovenia
1985 establishments in Slovenia
Postal museums